The Sunuds (Khalkha-Mongolian: Сөнөд/Sönöd; ; English: Sonid, Sönid) are a Southern Mongol subgroup. They live in Sonid Right Banner and Sonid Left Banner of China.

See also 

 Demographics of China
 List of medieval Mongolian tribes and clans

Southern Mongols
Mongols
Borjigin
Nirun Mongols